Middle of Nowhere is the debut studio album by American pop rock group Hanson, and the first to be released on a major label, which was Polygram Records and Mercury Records. Released in 1997, it features slicker studio production compared to their previous indie efforts Boomerang and MMMBop. The band members were between the ages of 11 and 16 when it was released. "Yearbook", one of the album's more dramatic songs, was not performed live until the recording of Middle of Nowhere Acoustic on May 5, 2007.

Middle of Nowhere yielded five singles: "MMMBop", "Where's the Love", "I Will Come to You", "Weird", and "Thinking of You". "MMMBop" became a major hit, reaching number one in the United States and at least eleven other countries.

Reception

Middle of Nowhere reached number two on the Billboard 200, being kept out of the top spot by the Spice Girls' Spice. The album also reached number one in the UK, Australia, Germany, and Taiwan.

Total sales worldwide are 10 million copies. The album sold just under 4 million in the US (4 times platinum) and over 400,000 copies in UK.

The album was well received by critics. David Browne of Entertainment Weekly said of the trio: "... lack of guile is Hanson's most endearing quality."

Track listing
All songs written by Isaac Hanson, Taylor Hanson and Zachary Hanson, with additional writers noted in parentheses.
"Thinking of You" – 3:13
"MMMBop" – 4:28
"Weird" – 4:02 (Desmond Child)
"Speechless" – 4:20 (Stephen Lironi)
"Where's the Love" – 4:13 (Mark Hudson, Sander Selover)
"Yearbook" – 5:29 (Ellen Shipley)
"Look at You" – 4:28 (Stephen Lironi)
"Lucy" – 3:35 (Mark Hudson)
"I Will Come to You" – 4:11 (Barry Mann, Cynthia Weil)
"A Minute Without You" – 3:55 (Mark Hudson)
"Madeline" – 4:13 (Clif Magness)
"With You in Your Dreams" – 3:56
"Man from Milwaukee" [CD-only hidden track] – 3:38

Note
"Man from Milwaukee" is actually track #21, as there are eight tracks of silence after "With You in Your Dreams". In Japan the song is track 14 because a remix of "MMMBop" serves as song 13. "Man from Milwaukee" was omitted from all cassettes and vinyl pressings of Middle of Nowhere. Some later reissues of the album in some locales including the remastered version omitted the tracks of silence and make "Man from Milwaukee" a true track 13.

Personnel
Hanson
 Zachary Hanson – drums, vocals
 Taylor Hanson – keyboards, piano, vocals
 Isaac Hanson – guitar, vocals

Session musicians
 Stephen Lironi – bass, guitar, percussion, programming, producer, keyboards
 Peter Kent – violin
 Michael Fischer – percussion
 Carole Mukogawa – viola
 John Wittenberg – violin
 Mike Shawcross – percussion
 Michito Sanchez – percussion
 Larry Corbett – cello
 Steve Richards – cello
 Ged Lynch – drums, percussion
 Nick Vincent – drums
 Endre Granat – violin
 Abe Laboriel Jr. – drums
 David Campbell – conductor, string arrangements
 Abraham Laboriel – bass
 Neil Stubenhaus – bass
 B.J. Cole – pedal steel
 Sandy Stein – keyboards
 DJ Swamp - turntables
 Mark Hudson – harmonica
 Murray Adler – violin

Other
 Roger Love – vocal director
 Margery Greenspan – art direction
 Steve Greenberg – executive producer
 Barry Mann – vocal director
 Marina Chavez – photography
 Ted Jensen – mastering
 The Dust Brothers – programming, producer
 Mark Hudson – vocal director

Charts

Weekly charts

Year-end charts

Decade-end charts

Certifications

References

Hanson (band) albums
1997 albums
Mercury Records albums
Albums arranged by David Campbell (composer)
Albums produced by the Dust Brothers
Albums produced by Stephen Lironi